The 2019 FIFA Beach Soccer World Cup qualifiers for UEFA was a beach soccer tournament contested by European men's national teams who are members of UEFA that determined the five nations from Europe that qualified to the 2019 FIFA Beach Soccer World Cup in Paraguay.

The event, organised by Beach Soccer Worldwide (BSWW) in cooperation with local entities, the Russian Football Union (RFU), Russian Ministry of Sport (RMoS) and the Government of Moscow, took place in Moscow, Russia from 19–27 July 2019. This also marked the first edition of the event to officially be under the patronage of UEFA, including the confederation's financial support.

The tournament was a multi-stage competition, consisting of a first group stage, knockout round, second group stage and finishing with placement matches.

Poland were the defending champions but were eliminated from title-winning contention in the second group stage, ultimately finishing seventh. The competition was won by hosts Russia who, along with Italy, Belarus, Switzerland and Portugal, earned qualification to the World Cup by finishing in the top five (with the Belorussian team notably qualifying for the first time).

Format
The tournament started with a round-robin group stage; the top nations from each group advanced to the round of 16. The eight winners of the round of 16 then advanced to the second round-robin group stage. The top two teams of each group (total of four nations) secured qualification to the World Cup; the winners of each group also advanced to the tournament final to contest the title; the nations finishing in second through fourth played in consolation matches to decide third through eighth place, with the team claiming fifth place also qualifying for the World Cup finals.

The format received criticism, being called the "softest" configuration in the history of UEFA qualifiers, "forgiving the mistakes of teams again and again", that in theory, a team could qualify for the World Cup despite winning just two and yet losing six matches.

Teams
20 teams entered, a figure markedly lower than in recent editions. They are listed below.

Some notable absentees included England, Romania and Greece (all ranked in the European top 20, present at all previous qualifiers) and the Netherlands who qualified to the World Cup via this event in 2013.

Venue

One venue was used in the city of Moscow, Russia.
All matches took place at a purpose built arena at the Festival Square area of the Luzhniki Olympic Complex in Khamovniki District, with a seating capacity of 3,500.

Draw
The draw to split the 20 teams into five groups of four was conducted by BSWW at the Marriott Hotel in Minsk, Belarus at 10:30 FET on 29 June.

Initially, all the teams were ordered according to their BSWW World Ranking. The top five teams (incl. the hosts) were seeded and each respectively assigned to position one of one of the groups. The remaining fifteen teams were then split into three pots of five according to their world ranking, with the highest placed in Pot 1 down to the lowest placed in Pot 3.

From each pot, the first team drawn was placed into Group A, the second team drawn placed into Group B and so on. Pot 1 teams were placed in position two, Pot 2 teams in position three and so on.

The composition of the seeds and pots is shown below:

First group stage
Each team earns three points for a win in regulation time, two points for a win in extra time, one point for a win in a penalty shoot-out, and no points for a defeat. The top three nations and best fourth placed nation from each group advances to the round of 16.

The competition format was announced on 16 April when up to 32 teams were expected to participate. Despite only 20 teams ultimately entering, BSWW decided not to change the format. With Ukraine's withdrawal, this means just three teams were eliminated at this stage.

All times are local, MSK (UTC+3).

Group A

Group B

Group C

Group D

Group E

Ranking of fourth-placed teams

Round of 16
The round of 16 ties are contested as single elimination matches. The eight winners progress to the second group stage.

Draw

Procedure
The draw took place at press centre of the host stadium immediately following the conclusion of the final match of the first group stage.

For the purpose of the draw, the 16 teams were split into four pots of four. The five group winners and three best second placed teams were divided between Pots 1 and 2, based on their BSWW World Ranking, with the highest ranked four placed in Pot 1 and the lowest ranked four in Pot 2. The two worst second placed teams, five third placed and best fourth placed nation were placed in Pots 3 and 4, also divided between pots in the same fashion.

Teams from Pot 1 were drawn against teams from Pot 4, and Pot 2 nations face those from Pot 3. The drawing of ties alternated as such.

Ranking of second-placed teams
The calculation of best and worst second placed teams was reformulated upon Ukraine's withdrawal, considering the occupants of Group D played just two matches.

Pots
The composition of the four pots is shown below.

Matches

Second group stage
The eight teams are split into two groups of four: the four winners of ties 3–6 of the round of 16 draw enter Group 1, whilst the four winners of ties 1, 2, 7 and 8 enter Group 2.

The teams that finish in the top two of each group earn qualification to the World Cup; those that finish in the corresponding positions of the two groups play against one another to determine the final standings of the tournament. The teams that play in the fifth place play-off will contest the last remaining spot at the World Cup.

Group 1

Group 2

Play-offs

Seventh place play-off

Fifth place play-off
Winner qualifies for the 2019 FIFA Beach Soccer World Cup.

Third place play-off

Final

Awards

Winners

Individual awards
The following awards were given at the conclusion of the tournament.

Top goalscorers
Players who scored at least 3 goals are listed

Final standings

Qualified teams to the FIFA Beach Soccer World Cup
The following five teams from UEFA qualify for the 2019 FIFA Beach Soccer World Cup.

1 Bold indicates champions for that year. Italic indicates hosts for that year.

Notes

References

External links
FIFA Beach Soccer World Cup 2019 – Europe Qualifier Moscow , at Beach Soccer Worldwide
Reports: Day 1, Day 2, Day 3, Day 4, Day 5, Day 6, Day 7, Day 8, Day 9.
World Championship 2019 – Qualifying Tournament – Europe, at Beach Soccer Russia (in Russian)
FIFA World Cup – UEFA Qualification, at Futebol de Praia Portugal (in Portuguese)

Uefa
2019
International association football competitions hosted by Russia
Beach soccer in Russia
Sports competitions in Moscow
2019 in beach soccer
2019 in Russian sport
July 2019 sports events in Europe